Caio Blat de Oliveira (born 2 June 1980) is a Brazilian actor.

Biography
Blat was born in São Paulo, Brazil. He studied law at the University of São Paulo, the largest and one of the most prestigious universities in Brazil, but dropped out because of his acting career.

Caio is cousin of the playwright Rogério Blat and of the also actor Ricardo Blat. The surname Blat is of Catalan origin and means 'wheat'.

Career 

Blat was discovered at age 8, when he accompanied his sisters to a test at an advertising agency, on their mother's initiative. He ended up being cast in a commercial and thereafter became a familiar face in advertising. He has participated in over 200 productions in various media. Self-taught, Blat never got a degree in Scenic Arts or finished the Law course he started. Blat has significant work in television, film and theater.

In 2006, Blat joined the cast of the remake of the telenovela Sinhá Moça, as the abolitionist Mário, and also participated in two plays, Mordendo os Lábios and O Mundo é um Moinho. In 2007, he was in the TV production Amazônia, de Galvez a Chico Mendes, as the rubber tapper Xavier. He was also acting in the theater with the plays The Two Gentlemen of Verona and Chorin. In that year, he won the São Paulo Citizen of the Year Prize in the actor category, for his contribution to the city.

Blat never played a stereotypical lead role, yet he always played some important role in the telenovelas. He says he prefers to work on stage and film rather than on TV.

Personal life 

Blat also works as a volunteer in a charity which caters for 400 needy children in Campinas, São Paulo. It was there that he met his adopted son, Antônio.

In 2006, Blat began dating actress Maria Ribeiro, whom he married in November 2007. Their son Bento was born in January 2010.

Caio Blat is a Spiritist.

Filmography

Television

Film

References

External links

1980 births
Living people
Male actors from São Paulo
Brazilian people of Arab descent
Brazilian people of Catalan descent
Brazilian male television actors
Brazilian male telenovela actors
Brazilian male stage actors
Brazilian male film actors
Brazilian spiritualists